Deool Band (IAST: Dē'ūḷa Banda) is a 2015 Indian Marathi-language drama film directed by Pravin Tarde and Pranit Kulkarni in their directorial debut. It released on 31 July 2015. It stars Gashmeer Mahajani and Girija Joshi in the lead roles, with Mohan Joshi portraying Swami Samarth - considered to be an incarnation of Lord Dattatreya. It is the story of a scientist who does not believe in god.

Plot
Dr. Raghav Shastri(Gashmeer Mahajani), Indian by origin, is NASA's youngest scientist. He returns to his motherland, only to find out that his country is full of God worshippers. However, Raghav is not one of them. He has been specially invited by the PM to work on a radio frequency project, which will strengthen the coastal security of the country. The people in-charge of his security, receive a tip-off from their sources that a terrorist group, led by Rashida and Hafiz, have arrived in Pune to kill Raghav Shastri and cripple India's coastal security project. Subsequently, they refuse to arrange his stay at a hotel, and relocate him to a posh society in Pune. He becomes agitated to find out a temple of Swami Samarth, a God whom his parents believed in a lot, within his society premises. Raghav, who has lied to his wife Radha and daughter Popo that his mother is dead, actually has an estranged relationship with her. For so many years, he has accused her of being responsible for the death of his father Damodar Shastri. Therefore, he decides to finish his project at the earliest and leave.
In ISRO, he is warmly welcomed by his superior Dr. Vyas(Mohan Agashe). However, his rival Dr. Ballar (Sunil Abhyankar) who had previously failed in this project, is agitated at his inclusion in the group. Meanwhile, during a family outing of Raghav, Hafiz tries to kill him by bombing the mall. However, he forgets the bomb in the rickshaw itself, which is later confiscated by the Anti-Terrorism Squad, who begin a hunt for Hafiz and his teammates. The night before the submission of the project to ISRO, Raghav is upset to find out a festival, dedicated to Swami Samarth, being celebrated in his society. He angrily storms at the event and makes a scene. Subsequently, he is man-handled and beaten by the residents. In retaliation, he calls up Dr. Vyas and blackmails him into shutting down the temple permanently, in exchange of the frequency project. Dr. Vyas is forced to call the police and gets the temple shut down. However, unknown to Raghav, in his absence, his daughter accidentally ends up locking his project with a password, that Raghav is unable to remember. However, the big twist happens when God Swami Samarth (Mohan Joshi) himself comes to Raghav to test his atheism.
Next day, Raghav confides his problem to ISRO, who give him a deadline of 3 days to submit it or else, be ousted from the contract. Raghav's colleague Dr. Deshpande recommends the name of Dr. Satyajit(Sunil Barve), a world-class hacker to him. He asks him to go to Sriharikota in Andhra Pradesh, to get his project unlocked. Meanwhile Raghav's mother comes and reveals herself to her daughter-in-law and granddaughter. Raghav, reluctantly, leaves with his family for Sriharikota, without informing his security personnel.

Cast
 Gashmeer Mahajani as Dr. Raghav Shastri
 Girija Joshi as Mrs. Shastri
 Mohan Joshi as Swami Samartha
 Mohan Agashe as Dr. Vyas (ISRO Head)
 Nivedita Joshi-Saraf as mother of Dr. Raghav Shastri
 Shweta Shinde as Raw agent
 Sharvari Jamenis as Rashida - Terrorist
 Ramesh Pardeshi as Hafiz - Terrorist
 Satish Alekar
 Kiran Yadnyopavit as undercover RAW agent
 Jay Agarwal
 Sanket Kotkar
 Pravin Tarde as Auto Driver
 Snehal Tarde
 Arpan Sheth
 Akshay Tanksale as Informer
 Sunil Abhyankar as Dr. Ballal
 Sunil Barve as Dr. Satyajeet / Fruit seller
 Vibhavari Deshpande as South Indian woman / Worker
 Sandeep Pathak as Vallabh (Garage owner) / Pujari
 Ravindra Mahajani as Gajanan Maharaj / Pujari
 Mahesh Manjrekar as Fakir
 Prasad Oak as Watchman (Nawadi) / Boat rider
 Sushant Shelar as Car parking attendant / Politician

Release
The movie was released in Maharashtra on 31 July 2015 on just 110 screens.

Box office

References

External links
 
 
 

2015 films
2010s Marathi-language films
Hinduism in popular culture
Films with atheism-related themes
Religious drama films